Seekoei-vlei Nature Reserve, is a massive wetland spanning some 30 km2, or 4,754 hectares, lying 2000 m above sea level; it surrounds the town of Memel, in the Free State, province of South Africa, which was declared a Ramsar site in 1999. It lies near the Drakensberg escarpment, near where Free State, Mpumalanga, and KwaZulu-Natal meet. It is unique for housing more than 250 species of birds, and the town is now a popular destination for bird enthusiasts, featuring bird hides and picnic facilities. It is also home to some hippopotamus, "seekoei" being the Afrikaans translation, as well as zebra.

Wetland 
Just north of Memel, the Pampoenspruit meets the Klip River, a tributary of the Vaal River, in a 25-km2 swamp with consisting of myriad marshes, pools, floodplains, lakes, and grasslands that often flood during the rainy season. It is one of the largest wetlands in the Highveld.

Flora and fauna 
Many rare and endangered birds can be found there. The following birds are especially common there: little bittern, yellow-billed stork, white-winged flufftail, blue crane, hedgehog, heron, stork, ibis, cattle egret, Southern masked weaver, common quail, whiskered tern, wattled crane, Basra reed warbler, Rudd's lark, and Botha's lark. Probably due to the cold temperatures at this altitude, snakes are not found here.

References

Nature reserves in South Africa
Protected areas of the Free State (province)
Ramsar sites in South Africa